Paramytha is a village located north of Limassol on the foothills of the Troodos mountains. Former world No.8 ranked tennis player Marcos Baghdatis was born in this village.

References

Communities in Limassol District